Maximilian III of Austria, briefly known as Maximilian of Poland during his claim for the throne (12 October 1558 – 2 November 1618), was the Archduke of Further Austria from 1612 until his death.

Biography

Born in Wiener Neustadt, Maximilian was the fourth son of the emperor Maximilian II and Maria of Spain. He was a grandson of Anna of Bohemia and Hungary, daughter and heiress of Vladislaus II of Bohemia and Hungary, who himself was the eldest son of Casimir IV of Poland from the Jagiellonian Dynasty.

From 1585 Maximilian became the Grandmaster of the Teutonic Order; thanks to this he was known by the epithet der Deutschmeister ("the German Master") for much of his later life.

In 1587 Maximilian stood as a candidate for the throne of Polish–Lithuanian Commonwealth, following the death of the previous king, Stefan Batory. A portion of the Polish nobility elected Maximilian king, but, as a result of the rather chaotic nature of the election process, another candidate, Sigismund III Vasa, prince of Sweden, grandson of Sigismund I the Old, was also elected. Maximilian attempted to resolve the dispute by bringing a military force to Poland – thereby starting the war of the Polish Succession. His cause had considerable support in Poland, but fewer Poles flocked to his army than to that of his rival. After a failed attempt to storm Kraków in late 1587, he was defeated in January 1588, at Pitschen in Silesia (Battle of Byczyna) by the supporters of Sigismund III (who had since been formally crowned), under the command of Polish hetman Jan Zamojski. Maximilian was taken captive at the battle and was only released a year and half later after the intervention of Pope Sixtus V in the aftermath of the Treaty of Bytom and Będzin. In 1589, he formally renounced his claim to the Polish crown. The inactivity of his brother, the emperor Rudolf II, Holy Roman Emperor in this matter contributed to Rudolf's poor reputation.

From 1593 to 1595 Maximilian served as regent for his young cousin, Ferdinand, Archduke of Inner Austria. In 1595 he succeeded their uncle Ferdinand II, Archduke of Further Austria in his territories, including Tyrol, where he proved to be a solid proponent of the Counter-Reformation. He also worked to depose Melchior Khlesl, and to ensure that Archduke Ferdinand of Inner Austria, his former charge, succeed as Holy Roman Emperor.

Today, Maximilian is perhaps best remembered for his baroque archducal hat, exhibited in the treasury of the monastery of Klosterneuburg and was used for ceremonial purposes as late as 1835.

He died at Vienna in 1618, and is buried in the canopied tomb in Innsbruck Cathedral.

Ancestors

References

Maximilian III of Austria
Maximilian III of Austria
17th-century archdukes of Austria
16th-century House of Habsburg
Roman Catholic monarchs
Candidates for the Polish elective throne
Austrian princes
Sons of emperors
Children of Maximilian II, Holy Roman Emperor
Sons of kings